The BMW M Hybrid V8 is a sports prototype racing car designed by BMW M and built by Dallara. It is designed to the Le Mans Daytona h regulations, and will debut in the 2023 IMSA SportsCar Championship at the season-opening 24 Hours of Daytona. It marks BMW's return to the top-flight of sports prototype racing since the BMW V12 LMR in 1999. The car will also contest the FIA World Endurance Championship from 2024 onwards.

Racing results

Complete IMSA SportsCar Championship results
(key) Races in bold indicates pole position. Races in italics indicates fastest lap.

* Season still in progress.

References

External links

 BMW M Hybrid V8 official booklet

Dallara racing cars
BMW racing cars
IMSA GTP cars
Hybrid electric cars
Sports prototypes
Le Mans Daytona h cars